The Baghdad Alliance (Tahaluf Baghdad) is an Iraqi electoral coalition formed to contest the 2018 general election. The party is a Sunni-based party. It is headed by the Secretary-General of the Sons of the Iraq Unit Mahmoud al-Mashhadani.

References

2018 establishments in Iraq
Political parties established in 2018
Sunni Islamic political parties